This page summarises the Main Path matches of the 2021–22 UEFA Europa Conference League qualifying phase and play-off round.

Times are CEST (UTC+2), as listed by UEFA (local times, if different, are in parentheses).

First qualifying round

Summary

|}

Matches

FCI Levadia won 4–2 on aggregate.

Puskás Akadémia won 3–1 on aggregate.

Drita won 3–1 on aggregate.

Sūduva won 2–1 on aggregate.

Birkirkara won 2–1 on aggregate.

FC Santa Coloma won 5–1 on aggregate.

Velež Mostar won 4–2 on aggregate.

Domžale won 2–1 on aggregate.

Shkupi won 3–1 on aggregate.

Dinamo Batumi won 7–0 on aggregate.

Partizani won 8–4 on aggregate.

Maribor won 2–0 on aggregate.

Laçi won 3–1 on aggregate.

Milsami Orhei won 1–0 on aggregate.

KuPS won 5–1 on aggregate.

Žilina won 6–3 on aggregate.

FH won 3–1 on aggregate.

Śląsk Wrocław won 4–1 on aggregate.

RFS won 6–5 on aggregate.

Larne won 2–0 on aggregate.

Ararat Yerevan won 3–1 on aggregate.

Sutjeska won 2–1 on aggregate.

Petrocub Hîncești won 2–1 on aggregate.

Vllaznia won 4–3 on aggregate.

Bohemians won 4–1 on aggregate.

The New Saints won 3–1 on aggregate.

1–1 on aggregate. Gżira United won 5–3 on penalties.

Kauno Žalgiris won 2–0 on aggregate.

Dundalk won 5–0 on aggregate.

Spartak Trnava won 4–3 on aggregate.

Liepāja won 5–2 on aggregate.

Breiðablik won 5–2 on aggregate.

Honka won 3–1 on aggregate.

Second qualifying round

Summary

|+Main Path

|}

Matches

KuPS won 5–4 on aggregate.

2–2 on aggregate. Shakhter Karagandy won 5–3 on penalties.

Hapoel Be'er Sheva won 6–0 on aggregate.

Žilina won 5–3 on aggregate.

Čukarički won 2–0 on aggregate.

Maccabi Tel Aviv won 3–1 on aggregate.

Astana won 3–2 on aggregate.

Sivasspor won 2–0 on aggregate.

AEL Limassol won 2–0 on aggregate.

Sochi won 7–2 on aggregate.

Elfsborg won 9–0 on aggregate.

RFS won 5–0 on aggregate.

Dinamo Batumi won 4–2 on aggregate.

Partizan won 3–0 on aggregate.

Dundalk won 4–3 on aggregate.

Rijeka won 3–0 on aggregate.

Viktoria Plzeň won 4–2 on aggregate.

The New Saints won 10–1 on aggregate.

Domžale won 2–1 on aggregate.

0–0 on aggregate. CSKA Sofia won 3–1 on penalties.

Santa Clara won 5–0 on aggregate.

Hibernian won 5–1 on aggregate.

Larne won 3–2 on aggregate.

Gent won 4–2 on aggregate.

Bohemians won 4–0 on aggregate.

2–2 on aggregate. Velež Mostar won 3–2 on penalties.

 
Qarabağ won 1–0 on aggregate.

1–1 on aggregate. Lokomotiv Plovdiv won 3–2 on penalties.

Śląsk Wrocław won 7–5 on aggregate.

Laçi won 1–0 on aggregate.

Feyenoord won 3–2 on aggregate.

Basel won 5–0 on aggregate.

Osijek won 1–0 on aggregate.

Breiðablik won 3–2 on aggregate.

1–1 on aggregate. Olimpija Ljubljana won 5–4 on penalties.

Hammarby won 4–1 on aggregate.

Molde won 3–2 on aggregate.

Újpest won 5–2 on aggregate.

0–0 on aggregate. Raków Częstochowa won 4–3 on penalties.

1–1 on aggregate. Spartak Trnava won 4–3 on penalties.

Rosenborg won 6–1 on aggregate.

Copenhagen won 9–1 on aggregate.

Vojvodina won 2–0 on aggregate.

Tobol won 4–3 on aggregate.

Aberdeen won 5–3 on aggregate.

Third qualifying round

Summary

|+Main Path

|}

Matches

Sivasspor won 3–2 on aggregate.

KuPS won 5–4 on aggregate.

3–3 on aggregate. Partizan won 4–2 on penalties.

Hapoel Be'er Sheva won 5–2 on aggregate.

Santa Clara won 3–0 on aggregate.

Basel won 6–1 on aggregate.

IF Elfsborg won 5–2 on aggregate.

0–0 on aggregate. Shakhter Karagandy won 3–1 on penalties.

Paços de Ferreira won 4–1 on aggregate.

Feyenoord won 6–0 on aggregate.

Gent won 3–2 on aggregate.

Rijeka won 5–2 on aggregate.

Aberdeen won 5–3 on aggregate.

4–4 on aggregate. Trabzonspor won 4–3 on penalties.

PAOK won 3–2 on aggregate.

5–5 on aggregate. Viktoria Plzeň won 4–1 on penalties. 

Raków Częstochowa won 1–0 on aggregate.

Copenhagen won 5–3 on aggregate.

Hammarby IF won 6–4 on aggregate.

Žilina won 6–0 on aggregate.

CSKA Sofia won 5–3 on aggregate.

LASK won 7–1 on aggregate.

Qarabağ won 2–1 on aggregate.

Maccabi Tel Aviv won 1–0 on aggregate.

Rosenborg won 8–2 on aggregate.

Anderlecht won 5–1 on aggregate.

Vitesse won 4–3 on aggregate.

Play-off round

Summary

|+Main Path

|}

Matches

Qarabağ won 4–1 on aggregate.

4–4 on aggregate. Basel won 4–3 on penalties.

CSKA Sofia won 3–2 on aggregate.

Tottenham Hotspur won 3–1 on aggregate.

Rennes won 5–1 on aggregate.

Vitesse won 5–4 on aggregate.

LASK won 3–1 on aggregate.

Maccabi Tel Aviv won 4–1 on aggregate.

PAOK won 3–1 on aggregate.

Union Berlin won 4–0 on aggregate.

Feyenoord won 6–3 on aggregate.

Gent won 3–1 on aggregate.

Copenhagen won 7–1 on aggregate.

Partizan won 3–2 on aggregate.

Roma won 5–1 on aggregate.

Anorthosis Famagusta won 3–1 on aggregate.

Jablonec won 8–1 on aggregate.

Notes

References

External links

1M